THQ may refer to:

 THQ, an American developer and publisher of video games 
 THQ Studio Australia, a former video game development subsidiary for THQ
 THQ Nordic, an Austrian developer and publisher of video games
 IATA code for Tianshui Maijishan Airport, China